William Carter House, also known as the Carter-Burge-Miller House, is a historic home located near Mount Airy, Surry County, North Carolina. It was built about 1834, and is a two-story, three bay, vernacular Federal style brick dwelling. A one-story rear kitchen ell was added in 1931–1932.  The interior features decorative 
painting from the Federal period.

It was listed on the National Register of Historic Places in 1990.

References

Houses on the National Register of Historic Places in North Carolina
Federal architecture in North Carolina
Houses completed in 1834
Houses in Surry County, North Carolina
National Register of Historic Places in Surry County, North Carolina
Mount Airy, North Carolina